Sila Nerangalil Sila Manithargal is a 1977 Indian Tamil-language romantic drama film directed by A. Bhimsingh and written by Jayakanthan. Based on Jayakanthan's novel of the same name, it stars Lakshmi and Srikanth, with C. K. Nagesh, Y. G. Parthasarathy, R. Neelakantan, Sukumari and S. Sundari Bai in supporting roles. The film revolves around a girl from an orthodox family whose life changes after a one-night stand.

Sila Nerangalil Sila Manithargal was released on 1 April 1977 and became a commercial success. Lakshmi won the National Film Award for Best Actress, the film's only win at the 24th National Film Awards.

Plot 
On a rainy night, Ganga, a college girl from an orthodox Tamil Brahmin family in Srirangam, is sexually assaulted by a stranger after he offers her a ride in his car. She returns home dazed from the experience and when asked by her mother Kanagam about what happened, she confesses. Kanagam creates a ruckus; all the neighbours and relatives learn of it.

Ganga's brother, the family's breadwinner, disowns and evicts her from the house. At the request of Kanagam, Ganga's maternal uncle Vengu takes her with him to Madras, and Ganga continues her education there. After graduating, she gets employed in a private firm and grows to take the top managerial position. Exploiting her blemished status, Vengu, who was once her guardian, makes sexual advances towards her several times, forcing Ganga to make Kanagam stay with her to keep herself protected from Vengu.

R. K. Viswanatha Sarma, a writer who witnessed Ganga entering the car on that rainy night, writes a story in a magazine in which the lead character, a girl, is molested by a stranger; after she returns home, her mother conceals the truth, cleanses her through a bath and the girl is able to live normally. Ganga reads the story and recommends it to Kanagam, which makes her feel guilty about the ruckus she had created.

Ganga, though successful at her workplace, remains withdrawn and aloof in life. When she rejects Vengu's advances, he challenges her to locate the stranger who had sex with her and live with him if she has the guts. Accepting the challenge, she takes Viswanatha Sarma's help, and locates Prabhakar alias Prabhu who offered her a ride on that rainy night. Prabhu is already married and has an adolescent daughter. He does not initially recognise Ganga as it was a one-night stand. When he recollects the experience, he feels upset that Ganga is still not settled in life. Prabhu says he thought she was a consenting partner and did not realise he was imposing himself on her.

Ganga and Prabhu's subsequent meetings result in friendship; their friendship matures into love. The new relationship is, however, unacceptable to both families; unable to transcend the society's norms, Prabhu advises her to marry someone else. When all attempts to convince Prabhu fail, Ganga is forced to part ways with him; she chooses to live with Prabhu's memories.

Cast 
 Lakshmi as Ganga
 Srikanth as Prabhakar
 C. K. Nagesh as R. K. Viswanatha Sarma
 Y. G. Parthasarathy as Vengu Mama
 R. Neelakantan as Ganesan
 Sukumari as "Anni" (Ganesan's wife)
 S. Sundari Bai as Kanagam
 Rajasulochana as Padma
 Jayageetha as Manju
 Bhuvanadevi as Immanuel

Production 
Sila Nerangalil Sila Manithargal is based on the novel of the same name, by Jayakanthan which was a detailed version of his short story Agnipravesam. A. Bhimsingh decided to adapt the novel into a feature film. Jayakanthan wrote the screenplay for the film discarding the traditional commercial elements. R. Muthuraman and J. Jayalalithaa initially gave their dates to act in the film, but Jayakanthan wanted Lakshmi and Srikanth. Since the film took considerable days of time to complete, Lakshmi did not cooperate during the time and she did not dub entirely for the film; instead another actress who appeared as an Anglo-Indian woman in the film had dubbed her voice.

Soundtrack 
The soundtrack was composed by M. S. Viswanathan. There are only two songs in the film: "Veru Idam Thedi" and "Kandathai Sollugiren Ungal".

Release and reception 
Sila Nerangalil Sila Manithargal was released on 1 April 1977. In a review dated 17 April 1977, Ananda Vikatan was positive towards the film, particularly Lakshmi's performance. Kanthan of Kalki lauded Lakshmi's performance, the relatively less use of dialogues compared to other Tamil films, the absence of unnecessary sets, Vittal Rao's cinematography and Jayakanthan's dialogues. The film became a commercial success, running for over 100 days in theatres. At the 24th National Film Awards, Lakshmi won the National Film Award for Best Actress, the film's only win at the ceremony.

Legacy 
Historian G. Dhananjayan considered Sila Nerangalil Sila Manithargal an important film in Tamil cinema for being "a searing criticism at the way marriage, sex and women were treated by society". The film, has, however been frequently criticised by another historian S. Theodore Baskaran for relying heavily on dialogues over visuals, including the characters reciting every dialogue in the novel verbatim. He accused the film of perpetuating this flaw of Tamil cinema.

References

Bibliography

External links 
 

1970s Tamil-language films
1977 romantic drama films
Films based on Indian novels
Films directed by A. Bhimsingh
Films featuring a Best Actress National Award-winning performance
Films scored by M. S. Viswanathan
Indian romantic drama films